Itanglese, which is also known as Anglitaliano or (in the United Kingdom) Britalian, refers to multiple hybrid types of language based on Italian and English.

There are numerous portmanteau terms that have been used to describe and label this phenomenon. Other forms include Italglish (from 1985), Itaglish (1986), Itlish (1993), Itinglish (1997), Italish (1988), Italgish (2000) and Italianglish (2011).

See also 
 Siculish, a macaronic combination of English and Sicilian.

References

External links
Itanglese ... or Anglitaliano: the Italians adopt a little English

Macaronic forms of English
Italian language